Beatrice S. Bartlett or Betsy Bartlett (born 1928) is an American historian of modern Chinese history, from the 1600s to the present. She is Professor Emeritus of History at Yale University.

Biography 
Bartlett received her B.A. from Smith College and Ph.D. (1980) from Yale University. She is best known for her work on Monarchs and Ministers: The Grand Council in Mid-Ch'ing China, 1723-1820 (1991), a significant expansion of her PhD dissertation, which has been described as the "best contribution to Ch'ing institutional history in any language." After teaching at Yale for a number of years, Bartlett retired in 2005 as a full professor, and became Professor Emerita of History.

Bartlett comes from a long line of Yale alumni, including being related to the first Chinese to graduate from a North American university, the Yale alumnus Yung Wing.

Selected works
 Monarchs and ministers : the Grand Council in Mid-Chʻing China, 1723-1820, 1991
 Ch'ing documents in the National Palace Museum Archives by Beatrice S Bartlett, 1974
 Jun zhu yu da chen : Qing zhong qi de jun ji chu (1723-1820), 2017
 The secret memorials of the Yung-Cheng period (1723-1735) : archival and published versions, 1974
 The vermilion brush : the Grand Council communications system and central government decision making in mid Chʻing China, 1980
 Archive materials in China on United States history, 1985
 Imperial notations on Chʻing official documents in the Chʻien-Lung (1736-1795) and Chia-Chʻing (1796-1820) reigns, 1972

References 

1928 births
Living people
American historians
Yale University alumni
Yale University faculty